This is a list of countries that have used postal orders.

British Empire and British Commonwealth

Colony of Aden
Aden Protectorate States
Alderney
Anguilla
Antigua
Antigua and Barbuda
Ascension Island
Australia (classed by issuing state and territory).
Australian Capital Territory
The Bahamas
Bangladesh
Barbados
Basutoland (overprinted South African British postal orders issued in Basutoland).
Bechuanaland Protectorate
Belize
Bermuda
Bophuthatswana
Botswana
British Cameroons
British Central Africa Protectorate
British Guiana
British Honduras
British North Borneo
British Solomon Islands Protectorate
British Somaliland Protectorate
British Virgin Islands
Brunei
Colony of Burma
Canada (classed by issuing province and territory).
Cape of Good Hope (Cape Colony)
Ceylon
Christmas Island (Indian Ocean)
Ciskei
Cocos (Keeling) Islands
Cyprus
Dominica
East Africa (classed by country of issue - British Somaliland Protectorate, Kenya, Tanganyika, Uganda, and Zanzibar).
Falkland Islands
Fiji
The Gambia
Ghana
Gibraltar
Gilbert and Ellice Islands
Gold Coast
Grenada
Guernsey
Guyana
Gwalior
Colony of Hong Kong
India
Ireland - from 1881 to 1949, when the Republic of Ireland was declared.
Isle of Man
Jamaica
Jersey
Jhind
Kenya
Lagos
Lesotho
Malawi
British Malaya (classed by issuing state and territory).
Malaysia (classed by issuing state and territory).
Malta
Mauritius
Montserrat
Nabha
Namibia
Colony of Natal
New Guinea
New South Wales
New Zealand
Nigeria
Niue
Norfolk Island
Northern Rhodesia
Northern Territory
Nyasaland
Orange Free State
Orange River Colony
Pakistan
Palestine
Territory of Papua
Papua and New Guinea
Papua New Guinea
Patiala
Pitcairn Islands
Queensland
Rhodesia
Rhodesia and Nyasaland (classed by colony of issue - Nyasaland, Northern Rhodesia, and Southern Rhodesia).
Saint Helena
Saint Kitts and Nevis
Saint Lucia
Saint Vincent and the Grenadines
Kingdom of Sarawak (from 1908, when the British postal order system was extended there)
Colony of Sarawak
Sark
Seychelles
Sierra Leone
Singapore
South Africa
South African Republic
Federation of South Arabia
South Australia
South West Africa
Southern Nigeria
Southern Rhodesia
Sri Lanka
Straits Settlements (classed by issuing state and territory).
Swaziland
Tanganyika
Tanzania (classed by whether they were issued in Tanganyika or Zanzibar).
Tasmania
Tonga
Transkei
Transvaal Colony
Trinidad
Trinidad and Tobago
Tristan da Cunha
Turks Islands
Uganda
United Kingdom (classed by constituent country of issue - England, Ireland/Northern Ireland, Scotland, and Wales).
Venda
Victoria (Australia)
Western Australia
Western Samoa
Zambia
Zanzibar
Zimbabwe

Other countries

Argentina
Bahrain
Bulgaria
Republic of Burma
China (Since 1898)
Colombia
Dubai
Ecuador
Egypt
Eritrea - overprinted British Postal Orders valid only in Eritrea
Ethiopia
France
Iraq
Israel
Ireland 
Italy
Jordan
Kuwait
Kingdom of Libya - during the reign of King Idris I
Luxembourg
Mexico
Kingdom of Nepal
Persian Gulf (GPO agencies)
Portugal
Qatar
Romania
 Russia (at the time of the Russian Empire)
San Marino
Southern Yemen
Sudan
Thailand
Transjordan
United Arab Republic
United States of America
People's Democratic Republic of Yemen

Special military issues

British Army of the Rhine
British Forces Post Offices
Indian Field Force in Egypt

References

Currencies of the British Empire
Currencies of the Commonwealth of Nations
Numismatics
Payment systems
Postal orders